Home and Garden may refer to:

 Residential garden, a garden at a residence or home
 Arlington Antebellum Home & Gardens, plantation house and gardens in Birmingham, Alabama
 Luther Burbank Home and Gardens, park in Santa Rosa, California
 Phoenix Home & Garden, magazine based in Phoenix, Arizona
 Homes & Gardens, magazine based in UK
 House & Garden (magazine), a lifestyle magazine

See also
 Better Homes and Gardens (disambiguation)
 HGTV (Home & Garden Television)
 Home garden (disambiguation)
 House & Garden (disambiguation)

 Natural Home and Garden, magazine